The Tennessee Attorney General (officially, Attorney General and Reporter) is a position within the Tennessee state government. The Attorney General is the chief law enforcement officer and lawyer for Tennessee. The current office holder is Jonathan Skrmetti, who was appointed by the Tennessee Supreme Court for an eight-year term in 2022 to fill that position.  His service officially began with his swearing in by Tennessee Governor Bill Lee, for whom he had previously served as chief legal counsel, on September 1, 2022.

Appointment by judiciary
Unlike any other state, the Tennessee Attorney General is an officer of the judicial branch, not the executive branch. Article VI Section 5 of the Tennessee Constitution provides for the appointment of the Attorney General by the justices of the Supreme Court for a term of 8 years. In most other states, the office of attorney general is appointed by the governor or elected by voters or the legislature.

Office of the Attorney General
The Attorney General oversees the work and operations of the Office of the Attorney General. In this capacity, he is assisted by various office heads.

Chief Deputy Attorney General - 
Lacey E. Mase

 responsible for coordinating and supervising the Office's work
 reviews much of the work done by the Office
 responsible for general management

Solicitor General - Andreé Sophia Blumstein

 oversees all litigation on appeals in the Tennessee Supreme Court, Court of Appeals, Court of Criminal Appeals, U.S. Supreme Court, and U.S. 6th Circuit Court of Appeals
 oversees all opinions published by the Attorney General

Chief of Staff - Brandon J. Smith

 responsible for administrative matters
 oversees talent management, organizational development, Information technology, fiscal issues, and facilities issues

List of attorneys general

References

External links
 Tennessee Attorney General official website
 Tennessee Attorney General articles at ABA Journal
 News and Commentary at FindLaw
 Tennessee Code at Law.Justia.com
 U.S. Supreme Court Opinions - "Cases with title containing: State of Tennessee" at FindLaw
 Tennessee Bar Association
 General Herbert H. Slatery, III profile at National Association of Attorneys General
 Press releases at Tennessee Attorney General